Suzanne M. Desan (born 1957) is an American historian. She is the Vilas-Shinner Professor of History at the University of Wisconsin-Madison, and the author or editor of four books on French history.

Early life
Suzanne Desan graduated from Princeton University. She earned a PhD from the University of California, Berkeley. Her sister is Christine Desan, Leo Gottlieb Professor of Law at the Harvard Law School (also a graduate of Princeton).

Career
Desan teaches at the University of Wisconsin-Madison, where she is the Vilas-Shinner Professor of History. She is the author of two books and the editor of two more books on French history, especially the role of women in the French Revolution.

Desan won the Herbert Baxter Adams Prize from the American Historical Association in 1992, and she was awarded a Guggenheim Fellowship in 1998.

Works

References

Living people
Princeton University alumni
University of California, Berkeley alumni
University of Wisconsin–Madison faculty
21st-century American historians
American women academics
American women historians
1957 births
21st-century American women